The 1999 elections to Argyll and Bute Council were held on the 6 May 1999 and were the second for the unitary authority, which was created under the Local Government etc (Scotland) Act 1994 and replaced the previous two-tier system of local government under Strathclyde Regional Council and Dumbarton and Argyll & Bute District Councils. It was held on the same day as the first Scottish Parliament election and resulted in no change to the administration of the council - independent control.

Election results

Ward results

References

External links

1999 Scottish local elections
1999